Love Life is a British drama television miniseries shown on ITV.

Cast

Episodes

Episode 1 
Air date - 15 March 2012

Joe (Rob James-Collier) returns from his latest trip abroad to find that ex-girlfriend Lucy (Andrea Lowe), is pregnant. The baby's father is her boss Dominic (Alexander Armstrong), who is married to Penny (Sophie Thompson). Penny wants a child but does not have one. When Penny knows that her husband has a baby with Lucy, she is upset but she wants Lucy to have the baby.

Episode 2 
Air date - 22 March 2012

Episode 3 
Air date - 29 March 2012

References

External links 

2012 British television series debuts
2012 British television series endings
2010s British drama television series
2010s British television miniseries 
ITV television dramas
English-language television shows
Television shows set in Manchester